Loney is a given name and a surname. Notable people with the name include:

Given name
Loney Gordon, (1915–1999), American chemist and laboratory researcher
Loney Haskell, (1870–1933), American vaudeville entertainer and theatre manager

Surname
 Allan Loney, Canadian ice hockey player
 Cleve Loney, American politician
 Ernest Loney, British middle- and long-distance runner
 Jack Loney, Australian writer and amateur maritime historian.
 James Loney (peace activist), a Canadian activist who was once held hostage in Iraq
 James Loney (baseball), American baseball player
 John Loney, Canadian politician
 June Loney, Australian harpist
 Michael Loney, Australian actor
 Milton R. Loney, American politician
 Peter Loney, Victoria, Australia politician
 S L Loney, British mathematician
 Troy Loney, Canadian ice hockey player
 William Loney, British naval officer
 Willie Loney, Scottish footballer

See also
Lonie
Looney (surname)